The Little Jennie is a Chesapeake Bay bugeye built in 1884 and designed by J.T. Marsh of Solomons, Maryland.  She is homeported at Centerport, Suffolk County, New York.  Her hull is 54 feet in length at the waterline, her beam is 15.6 feet, and her draft is 3.5 feet.  She was restored between 1976 and 1985.

She was listed on the National Register of Historic Places in 1986.

References

External links
Official Little Jennie website
Schooner Man website

Fishing ships of the United States
Ships on the National Register of Historic Places in New York (state)
Suffolk County, New York
1884 ships
National Register of Historic Places in Suffolk County, New York